Heliozela sobrinella is a moth of the Heliozelidae family. It was described by Deventer in 1904 as almost identical to Heliozela praeustella but a bit larger, with a wingspan of 6 mm (0.24 in). It is found on Java.

References

Moths described in 1904
Heliozelidae